John Jeffreys (1706 – 30 January 1766) of The Priory, Brecon, and Sheen, Surrey,  was a Welsh politician who sat in the House of Commons from 1734 to 1766. He lost a fortune gambling but was awarded lucrative public positions under successive Administrations. 

Jeffreys was the eldest son of John Jeffreys, MP and his wife Elizabeth Sturt, daughter of Anthony Sturt, MP of London. His father and his uncle, Sir Jeffrey Jeffreys were wealthy tobacco merchants. He was a member of White's Club and succeeded his father in 1715 but was a gamester who soon ran through his fortune.

Jeffreys contested Brecon at the 1727 British general election, but was unsuccessful. He was returned as Member of Parliament for Breconshire by a small majority at the 1734 British general election. He began his career in opposition, and became an adherent of  Pulteney. He was returned unopposed at the 1741 British general election. After the fall of Walpole in 1742, Pulteney  made him Joint Secretary to the Treasury, worth about £5,000 p.a. at the time. Horace Walpole described the appointment as White's contribution to the Government. Jeffreys was the only friend of Pulteney  who was not turned out of office at the end of 1744.  It was said that he was inefficient and incapable of carrying on the business of the Treasury and that almost everybody in the House of Commons wondered what public reason could be given for keeping him in post. Pelham, who was a fellow member of White's, replied that Jeffreys was a good retired inoffensive creature, and the public had no interest in his appointment, so he was not going to react to the resentment of others. However, in 1746 Pelham wanted to ensure a competent replacement for the octogenarian Secretary to the Treasury, and Jeffreys resigned from his position in May 1746, taking an anuual payment of £1,000 p.a. in compensation. 

At the 1747 British general election Jeffreys was returned unopposed as MP for Dartmouth. In due course he was appointed secretary to the Chancellor of the Exchequer in 1752 and stayed in post until 1754.  He  was returned unopposed again at the 1754 British general election and was appointed Warden of the Mint in 1754. In 1757 he was appointed deputy ranger of St James's and Hyde Parks. He was returned for Dartmouth unopposed again at the  1761 British general election and in 1761 he was given a regular secret service pension of £500 p.a. He continued to support and be financially supported by successive Governments. 

Jeffreys died unmarried on 30 January 1766.

References

1706 births
1766 deaths
People from Brecon
Welsh politicians
Members of the Parliament of Great Britain for Welsh constituencies
Members of the Parliament of the United Kingdom for Dartmouth
British MPs 1734–1741
British MPs 1741–1747
British MPs 1747–1754
British MPs 1754–1761
British MPs 1761–1768